The Firemen's Monument is a  tall  monument in Hoboken, Hudson County, New Jersey, United States,  that was designed by American sculptor Caspar Buberl and completed in 1891. The monument was built to commemorate the Volunteer Fire Department in Church Square Park on May 30, 1891.

History

Starting in the 19th Century, statues of firemen who died in the line of duty were placed in municipal burial plots, which eventually led to placement of monuments in more accessible public places and often to commemorate various departments or events. The monument in Hoboken was built to commemorate the end of the Volunteer firefighters in the city, as earlier that year, firefighting became a paid profession. The first statues were made using marble, but many, including the Firemen's monument in Hoboken, were sculpted using zinc and cast in bronze by Caspar Buberl and sold by J.W. Fiske.

Monument

Standing in the west end of Church Square Park at Garden Street and 5th Street, the Firemen's Monument sits atop a 20-foot granite pedestal that features emblems of a ladder, pike poles and a fire hose on its face. The statue itself is approximately 8 feet tall and features a mustached firemen in uniform, holding a small child in nightdress in his left arm and a lantern in his right hand. Similar statues have been noted as being modeled after statues of the Virgin Mary cradling the baby Jesus. The monument reads:

Legacy
With Hobokens' rich history and multiple National Register of Historic Places sites, a tour is run yearly and begins with the statue. Because of Hobokens vicinity and viewpoint to New Jerseyians during the September 11th attacks which resulted in the lives of many firefighters being lost, appreciation of these zinc statues has been renewed.

See also
 List of firefighting monuments and memorials
National Register of Historic Places listings in Hudson County, New Jersey

References

1891 sculptures
Firefighting memorials
Firefighting in New Jersey
Monuments and memorials in New Jersey
Monuments and memorials on the National Register of Historic Places in New Jersey
Buildings and structures in Hoboken, New Jersey
Outdoor sculptures in New Jersey
Bronze sculptures in New Jersey
National Register of Historic Places in Hudson County, New Jersey
Statues in New Jersey
Sculptures of men in New Jersey
1891 establishments in New Jersey
New Jersey Register of Historic Places
Public art in Hudson County, New Jersey